Sphinx is the designation of an American test satellite. The Sphinx satellite was the payload for the first Titan IIIE Centaur rocket. The Helios, Viking and Voyager space probes were later launched using this rocket.

It was launched on February 11, 1974 from a Titan IIIE Centaur. However, the rocket did not reach Earth orbit because the second stage failed to ignite, at which point the range safety officer ordered the rocket destroyed. The satellite was launched with the Viking Dynamic Simulator.

SPHINX stood for Space Plasma High Voltage Interaction Experiment. It was designed to test high-voltage equipment in outer space.

See also 

 1974 in spaceflight

References

External links 
 Entry at Gunter's Space Page
 Entry at Encyclopedia Astronautica

Satellite launch failures
Spacecraft launched in 1974